Projections is an album by saxophonist John Handy's Concert Ensemble featuring tracks recorded in 1968 and originally released on the Columbia label.

Reception

AllMusic awarded the album 4 stars and its review by Scott Yanow states, "The music (much more concise in general than on the previous two Columbias) contains plenty of surprises and is difficult to categorize (somewhere between the avant-garde and hard bop), although it does not reach the same heights as New View".

Track listing
All compositions by John Handy
 "Three in One" - 4:00
 "Projections" - 3:15
 "A Song of Uranus" - 9:03
 "Senôra Nancye" - 6:30
 "Dance to the Lady" - 7:22
 "Sanpaku" - 2:27
 "Eros" - 3:53
 "All the Way to the West, By God, Virginia" - 8:08

Personnel 
John Handy - alto saxophone, flute
Michael White - violin
Mike Nock - piano
Bruce Cale - bass
Larry Hancock - drums

References 

1968 albums
John Handy albums
Albums produced by John Hammond (producer)
Columbia Records albums